FC Aarau is a Swiss football club based in Aarau. They play in the Swiss Challenge League, the second tier of Swiss football after being relegated from Swiss Super League.

History

FC Aarau was formed on 26 May 1902 by workers from a local brewery. The early days of the club were a success and they won the Swiss championship in 1911–12 and then again in 1913–14. The club spent 25 years, from 1907 to 1933, in the top league but were relegated to the lower league and were unable to return to the top flight for a number of decades. In the 1980–81 season the club were able to return to the top league in the Swiss football pyramid after a 3–1 victory over Vevey-Sports. They have stayed there ever since and in the 1992–93 season they won the Swiss National League A managed by Austrian Rolf Fringer.

The club have also had success in the Swiss Cup finishing as runners up in 1930, 1989. In 1985 Aarau tasted their only victory in the Swiss Cup, coached by Ottmar Hitzfeld.

At the end of 2002 the club was almost in financial ruin. They were saved when the then Club President Michael Hunziker made 15,100 shares available to purchase. This succeeded in staving off the threat of liquidation.

FC Aarau is also known as a lucky team as they have been in the top flight since 1981 and barely escaped relegation on numerous occasions earning the club the nickname 'Die Unabsteigbaren' which translates into 'those that cannot be relegated.'

Club Structure

On 7 January 2003, with the club on the brink of financial ruin, a total of 15,100 shares were issued for a total of 1,510,000 Swiss francs. A new holding company, FC Aarau Ltd, was set up to administer the club. FC Aarau Ltd are responsible for the implementation, organization and management of professional football games of the 1st XI and the performance of teams in the junior area. Since 2006 the old club FC Aarau 1902
has only been in charge of children's and women's teams.

The current President of FC Aarau Ltd is local entrepreneur Philipp Bonorand, who has been in charge since 26 May 2020. FC Aarau 1902 is looked after by Marcel Meier and Philipp Bonorand.

Former manager Urs Schönenberger stood down in 2006 and the role was assumed by his assistant manager Ruedi Zahner. Ruedi was born in Aarau and spent nine years at the club as a player in two separate spells. However his appointment only lasted a few months. During the winter break in the 2006/07 season Zahner was replaced by FC Baden coach Ryszard Komornicki on a temporary basis. However, with relegation looming Gilbert Gress was brought in with three games to go. The move was a success and the club gained 5 points from the remaining games and so escaped relegation by one point. Gilbert Gress decided not to renew his contract with the club and so former Polish international Ryszard Komornicki returned. He has signed a contract until Summer 2010 but was replaced in June 2009 by Jeff Saibene who didn't last long as he was sacked on 12 October after Aarau achieved only 5 points in 12 games.

Honours

Leagues
National League A/Top League
Champions: 1911–12, 1913–14, 1992–93
Swiss Challenge League
Champions: 2012–13
Promoted: 1980–81

Cups
Swiss Cup
Champions: 1984–85
Runners-up: 1929–30, 1988–89
Swiss League Cup
Champions: 1981–82

Players

Current squad

Out on loan

Stadium

Aarau play their home games in Stadion Brügglifeld. The current capacity is 8'000 seats. The away supporters are housed behind one goal, to the right of where the players run out.

The stadium was opened on 12 October 1924 with a friendly game against local side FC Zürich. A new main stand was added in 1982 and in the 1990s the addition of a smaller grandstand and a complete renovation of the standing areas. The stadium is on the municipality of Suhr.

In 2008 the latest proposals were put forward for a new urban development to include a new home for FC Aarau. The Mittelland Arena, in the heart of Central Park in Aarau, should be used to cover 12,500 seats. On 25 September 2005 the proposal for the new development, including the football stadium and a shopping centre, were rejected by the people of Aarau in a referendum. FC Aarau Ltd and the city council are currently working on a new solution for the club as the current stadium is considered to be not good enough for top-flight football. The Swiss Football Association is unhappy at its use in the top flight.

Supporters

FC Aarau supporters are known as a very passionate group, despite their relatively small numbers in comparison to many other teams in Switzerland. There are many fan groups but the most popular is known as Szene Aarau.

Rivalries

Despite their close proximity to Zürich, Aarau fans have no dislike of either FC Zürich or Grasshopper Club Zürich. Their rivalries are with FC St. Gallen, FC Schaffhausen and FC Luzern. These are due to a number of historical reasons.

FC Aarau in Europe

Former players

Former coaches

References

External links
 
FC Aarau Unofficial Forum 
Szene Aarau 
FC Aarau Ladies Team 
Soccerway profile
Just Cant Beat That profile 

 
Football clubs in Switzerland
Association football clubs established in 1902
Aarau
1902 establishments in Switzerland